Irina Alexandrovna Vasilevich (born 19 April 1985) is a Russian chess player who holds the titles of Woman Grandmaster and International Master.

Biography
In 2006, Irina Vasilevich won the International Women's Chess Tournament in Krk. In 2011, she won the International Women's Chess Tournament in Rijeka. In 2013, Irina Vasilevich won the Moscow City Women's Chess Championship. She four times participated at the European Women's Chess Clubs Cup (2005, 2007, 2010-2011).

In 2000s Irina Vasilevich participated in Women's World Chess Championship by knock-out system:
 In Women's World Chess Championship 2006 in the first round lost to Svetlana Matveeva,
 In Women's World Chess Championship 2010 in the first round lost to Marie Sebag.

In 2004, she was awarded the FIDE Woman International Master (WIM) title and received the FIDE Woman Grandmaster (WGM) and International Master (IM) titles year later.

References

External links

1985 births
Living people
Russian female chess players
Chess woman grandmasters
Chess International Masters